Paul Tierney may refer to:

Paul Tierney (footballer) (born 1982), English-born Irish footballer
Paul Tierney (referee) (born 1980), English football referee
Paul Tierney (rugby league) (1919–1973), Australian rugby league footballer
Paul Tierney (hurler) (born 1982), Irish hurler and Cumbria-based fellrunner
Paul E. Tierney (born 1943), American businessman